Frenchgate may refer to:

 'Frenchgate' - the name given to a leak of a controversial and disputed memo during the 2015 UK General Election for which Scottish Secretary Alistair Carmichael took responsibility after the election 
 Frenchgate Centre, Doncaster, United Kingdom
 Frenchgate Interchange, Doncaster, United Kingdom